Tjuvfjorden is a 45 km long and up to 30 km wide fjord separating Edgeøya’s two southern promontories, Kvalpynten (Whale Point) and Negerpynten (Negro Point).

The fjord was originally named Deicrowe's Sound by the English in 1616 after Benjamin Decrow, who was a leading figure of the Muscovy Company from 1610 onwards. This name appears on the Muscovy Company's map (1625) down to at least William Scoresby’s (1820).

References and sources
References

Sources
 Norwegian Polar Institute: Place names in Norwegian polar areas
Purchas, S. 1625. Hakluytus Posthumus or Purchas His Pilgrimes: Contayning a History of the World in Sea Voyages and Lande Travells by Englishmen and others. Volumes XIII and XIV (Reprint 1906 J. Maclehose and sons).

Fjords of Svalbard
Edgeøya